The Ol Onal is an alphabetic  writing script of Bhumij language, spoken by Bhumij peoples. Ol Onal script was created between 1981 and 1992 by Ol Guru Mahendra Nath Sardar. Ol Onal script is used to write Bhumij language in some parts of West Bengal, Jharkhand, Orissa, and Assam.

History 
The Ol Onal script was created in between 1981 and 1992 by Ol Guru Mahendra Nath Sardar for the Bhumij language.

Bhumij community had no written language and knowledge was transmitted orally from one generation to other. Later researchers started to use Devanagari, Bengali, and Odia scripts to document the Bhumij language. However, Bhumijs did not have their own script. His invention of the Ol Onal script enriched the cultural identity of the tribal Bhumij community. He wrote many text books in the Ol Onal script.

Language 

Bhumij is the language of the Munda subfamily of the Austroasiatic languages, related to Ho, Mundari and Santali, spoken mainly in the Indian states Jharkhand, Odisha and West Bengal. It is spoken by around 100,000 people in India.

See also
 Bhumij
 Bhumij language

References

External links
 The Ol Onal Alphabet at Omniglot
 Proposal to encode the Ol Onal script

Alphabets
Munda scripts
Constructed scripts
Writing systems
Writing systems of Asia
Bhumij language
Bhumij